Vlada is a Slavic given name, derived from the word vlada meaning "rule". It is a masculine name in Serbia and feminine name in Romania, Ukraine, Moldova, Bulgaria and Russia. It may refer to:
Vlada Avramov (born 1979), Serbian footballer

Vlada Divljan (born 1958), Serbian singer
Vlada Ekshibarova; now Vlada Katic (born 1989), Israeli-Uzbekistani tennis player
Vlada Jovanović (born 1973), Serbian basketball coach and former player
Vlada Kubassova (born 1995), Estonian footballer
Vlada Stošić (born 1965), Serbian footballer
Vlada Roslyakova (born 1987), Russian model

See also
Vladas, given name
Vlade, given name

References

Serbian masculine given names
Russian feminine given names